Rasina Arujärv, or more simply known as just Arujärv, is a lake in Põlva County, Estonia.

See also
List of lakes of Estonia

Lakes of Estonia
Põlva Parish
Lakes of Põlva County